M.G.R Memorial Complex is a memorial complex built on the Marina beach in Chennai, Tamil Nadu, India. Spread over 8.25 acres, the memorial is located adjacent to the Anna Memorial. It was built in memory of former chief ministers of Tamil Nadu who died in office, M. G. Ramachandran and his protégé J. Jayalalithaa, whose bodies were buried at the site on 25 December 1987 and 6 December 2016, respectively.

History
The memorial was built in 1988 and inaugurated by V. N. Janaki Ramachandran, wife of M. G. Ramachandran, in May 1990. The memorial was remodelled and the complex was laid with marble and opened in 1992 by J. Jayalalithaa who had become the chief minister of the state of Tamil Nadu in the previous year. When J. Jayalalithaa died on 5 December 2016, she was buried next to MGR. This structure was designed by architect K. Ramachandran, retired chief architect of PWD.  Between 1996 and 1998, the mausoleum was again renovated at a cost of about  27.5 million.  When the Indian Ocean tsunami struck the seafront in December 2004, the memorial was damaged. Repair works cost approximately  13.3 million.

In 2012, the memorial was again renovated at a cost of  43 million, including  34 million for remodelling the facade and the surrounding wall. This renovation included a new entrance with the AIADMK party's two-leaves symbol and Pegasus, the horse from Greek mythology, landscaping of the open area around the memorial using Korean grass, and the planting of exotic, decorative plants such as palmyra alpha, date palm, spider lily and adenium. Also included were a granite pathway shaped like a guitar, stainless steel handles around the memorial, a fountain in the middle, waterfall at the rear, decorative lamps, and an overhead tower with lights both at the entrance and on the arch. Two pergolas 18 metres wide were also constructed, in addition to ramps for the physically challenged.

The erection of the two-leaves insignia was opposed by the opposition DMK party. A public interest petition was filed in the Madras High Court in October 2012 against the erection of the two-leaves insignia, but was dismissed by the court.

In 2016, when his protégé J. Jayalalithaa died, she was buried behind her mentor, opposite to the memorial to her archrival, M. Karunanidhi. A new memorial was built for her at a cost of ₹500 million rupees. The Jayalalithaa Memorial or the Amma Memorial is shaped like a phoenix. The Construction Works of Jayalalithaa's memorial started on 7 May 2018.

On 27 January 2021, The memorial of Jayalalithaa was inaugurated by then Chief Minister of Tamil Nadu Edappadi K. Palaniswami.

Entrance

Until 2012, the facade of the memorial was a tall entry arch with folded hands which was replaced with a concrete replica of the two-leaves emblem, the symbol of the AIADMK party founded by M. G. Ramachandran. The facade was also given a Grecian touch with the erection of a 12-foot-high bronze sculpture of Pegasus, the winged horse of Greek mythology. The 3.75-tonne sculpture, by architect R. Ravindran, a sthapathi from Mamallapuram, is set on a 4.5-metre-high pedestal.

Two 15.9-metre-high columns serving as the entrance were built with reinforced concrete. The elevated "two-leaves" structure is supported by a 6-metre-high beam serving as the stem. The leaf structure, with a span of 10.2 metres for each leaf, is a metre higher than the towering columns. The leaves have a slight resemblance to a honey comb and are visible from both the front and the rear.

Museum
A museum on M. G. Ramachandran's life is located within the memorial at the northern side of the campus.

Image gallery

See also

 Anna Memorial
 Marina Beach

References

Tourist attractions in Chennai
Buildings and structures in Chennai
Monuments and memorials in Chennai
Memorials to M G Ramachandran
1988 establishments in Tamil Nadu
Buildings and structures completed in 1988